St. Ansgar Community School District is a rural public school district headquartered in St. Ansgar, Iowa.

It is mostly in Mitchell County with a portion in Worth County. In addition to St. Ansgar, Grafton, Stacyville, and Mona are within the district borders.

In 2019, it, with the Northwood-Kensett Community School District, began an agreement to share superintendents. The St. Ansgar board approved the agreement in April of that year on a 4-1 basis.

Schools
The district operates three schools, all in a single facility in St. Ansgar:
 St. Ansgar Elementary School
 St. Ansgar Middle School
 St. Ansgar High School

St. Ansgar High School
The former building closed. A group of students established a theater group as a way of preventing the demolition of the former building.

Athletics
The Saints participate in the Top of Iowa Conference in the following sports:
Football
 2011 Class 1A State Champions
Cross Country
Volleyball
Basketball
Bowling
Wrestling
Golf
Track and Field
Baseball
Softball

See also
List of school districts in Iowa
List of high schools in Iowa

References

External links
 St. Ansgar Community School District

Education in Mitchell County, Iowa
Education in Worth County, Iowa
School districts in Iowa